Ralph Oscar Hatch (1 May 1876 – 13 July 1944) was an Australian rules footballer who played with St Kilda in the Victorian Football League (VFL).

References

External links 

1876 births
1944 deaths
Australian rules footballers from Melbourne
St Kilda Football Club players